Bokuseki (墨跡) is a Japanese term meaning "ink trace", and refers to a form of Japanese calligraphy (shodō) and more specifically a style of zenga developed by Zen monks.

Bokuseki is often characterized by bold, assertive, and often abstract brush strokes meant to demonstrate the calligrapher's pure state of mind (see Samadhi). The aim in making Bokuseki is to represent ones single-moment awareness by brushing each word or passage with a single breath, ultimately realizing Zen and manifesting ones zazen practice into physical and artistic action. Fundamentally bokuseki is a reflection of one's spontaneous action (see: Buddha-nature, katsu) free from one's superficial or rationally oriented mind.

Gallery

See also 
Japanese calligraphy
Zenga
Hitsuzendō

External links 

East Asian calligraphy
Japanese calligraphy
Zenga
Japanese art
Zen art and culture
Buddhism in the Edo period
History of art in Japan

ja:日本の書流#唐様